Joy Ballard (born 1966) is a British head teacher. She has been prominently featured in the media discussing the potential for improvement in schools and issues with the British education system.

Ballard grew up in Southampton on a council estate, and became notable as the former head teacher of Willows High School in Cardiff. She starred in the television documentary series Educating Cardiff for her role in making Willows High School one of the most improved schools in Wales during her three-year term as head teacher. In August 2015, she became the head teacher of Ryde Academy on the Isle of Wight. The Hampshire County Council had been overseeing education on the Isle since 2013 because of concerns over the school's former sponsor, Academies Enterprise Trust (AET), and their lack of regard for the "welfare or education of students or staff." Ballard improved the exam results of the school in twelve months as head teacher. In addition to her role on Educating Cardiff, she has been featured on This Morning with Eamonn Holmes, and was interviewed on Capital FM radio.

References

Schoolteachers from Hampshire
1966 births
Living people
Welsh schoolteachers
Schoolteachers from the Isle of Wight